Xhemile Berisha (born 22 July 1981) is a Kosovan-born Albanian footballer who plays as a midfielder for Kosovo Women's Football League club KFF Mitrovica, where serves as its captain. She has been a member of the Albania women's national team.

See also
List of Albania women's international footballers

References

1981 births
Living people
Albanian women's footballers
Women's association football midfielders
KFF Vllaznia Shkodër players
Albania women's international footballers
People from the District of Pristina
Kosovan women's footballers
KF Hajvalia players
KFF Mitrovica players
Kosovan people of Albanian descent
Sportspeople of Albanian descent